Hanson Bay is a large bay which comprises almost the entire east coast of Chatham Island, the largest island in New Zealand's Chatham Islands archipelago. The bay may formerly have been used as a resting ground by southern right whales and dolphins.

References

Landforms of the Chatham Islands
Bays of the New Zealand outlying islands
Chatham Island